"Street Spirit (Fade Out)" is a song by the English alternative rock band Radiohead. It is the final track on their second studio album, The Bends (1995). It was released as a single on 22 January 1996 and reached number five on the UK Singles Chart, Radiohead's highest position up to that point. It has been covered by acts including Peter Gabriel and the Darkness.

Composition
Songwriter Thom Yorke said "Street Spirit" was inspired by the American band R.E.M. and the 1991 novel The Famished Road by Ben Okri. It features a guitar arpeggio written by Yorke and played by Ed O'Brien. In 2018, Pitchfork wrote that the song "channels a sense of capitalist dread that even class-conscious Britpop artists repressed".

Music video
The music video for "Street Spirit" was filmed over two nights in a desert outside Los Angeles. It was directed by Jonathan Glazer, who described it as a "turning point" for his work. He felt that Radiohead had "found their own voices as an artist" and that "I got close to whatever mine was, and I felt confident that I could do things that emoted, that had some kind of poetic as well as prosaic value".

Release 
"Street Spirit" was released on Radiohead's second album, The Bends (1995). It was released as a single in January 1996, and reached number five on the UK Singles Chart, Radiohead’s highest placement up to that point. After their previous singles had failed to match the success of their 1992 debut single "Creep", "Street Spirit" demonstrated that Radiohead were not one-hit wonders. In 2008, "Street Spirit" was featured on Radiohead: The Best Of.

Covers
Peter Gabriel recorded a cover of "Street Spirit" for his album Scratch My Back (2010), hoping that Radiohead would record a version of his 1982 song "Wallflower" for his album And I'll Scratch Yours (2013). According to Gabriel, Radiohead ceased communication after he sent his version of "Street Spirit" and backed out of the project. Gabriel said his rendition was "pretty extreme", and had since heard that the band did not like it.

In 2012, the Darkness released a cover of "Street Spirit" on their album Hot Cakes. The band had included the song in their live shows in 2003. In 2020, System of a Down drummer John Dolmayan released a cover with M. Shadows of Avenged Sevenfold and Tom Morello of Rage Against the Machine as a part of his covers project These Grey Men.

Track listing

CD 1
 "Street Spirit (Fade Out)" – 4:13
 "Talk Show Host" – 4:41
 "Bishop's Robes" – 3:25

CD 2
 "Street Spirit (Fade Out)" – 4:13
 "Banana Co." – 2:20
 "Molasses" – 2:27

Personnel
All personnel adapted from the liner notes.

Radiohead
 Thom Yorke
 Jonny Greenwood 
 Ed O'Brien
 Colin Greenwood
 Philip Selway

Production
 John Leckie – production "(Street Spirit", "Banana Co."), mixing "(Street Spirit"), engineering "(Street Spirit")
 Nigel Godrich – production ("Talk Show Host", "Bishop's Robes", "Molasses"), engineering ("Street Spirit"), mixing ("Talk Show Host", "Molasses")
 Chris Brown – engineering
 Chris Blair – mastering
 Jim Warren – initial production ("Banana Co.")
 Sean Slade – mixing ("Banana Co.")
 Paul Q. Kolderie – mixing ("Banana Co.")

Design
 Stanley Donwood – art
 The White Chocolate Farm – art

Charts

Year-end charts

Certifications

References

External links
 
 
 
 
Article from The Guardian with Jonathan Glazer talking about the video

Radiohead songs
1996 singles
1996 songs
Parlophone singles
Music videos directed by Jonathan Glazer
Black-and-white music videos
Songs written by Thom Yorke
Songs written by Colin Greenwood
Songs written by Jonny Greenwood
Songs written by Philip Selway
Songs written by Ed O'Brien
Songs about death
Song recordings produced by John Leckie